Hathuran  is an Indian village situated beside NH 8, about 42 km from Surat, near the larger city of Kosamba. It is well connected to Indian railways. Local trains from Surat or Bharuch can be taken to reach Hathuran.

Geography
On the outskirts of the village, there are many buffaloes, cattle and other such livestock. There are two schools, one state and one private. Some activities include playing a game called "saat thikiri".

Notable person
The cricketer Gulam Bodi was born in Hathurun and emigrated to South Africa as a teenager. He went on to represent South Africa Schools and played for the Under-19 side in the World Cup. He came close to a national call-up - he was summoned to the West Indies but broke a finger - but then slipped from the radar. The introduction of Pro20 brought a new lease of life to his game and after a successful run in the top order for the Titans he was named in the Twenty20 World Championship squad and played for the Highveld Lions.

References

Villages in Bharuch district